The ALCo Century 636 was the most powerful single-engine diesel-electric locomotive constructed by the American Locomotive Company (ALCo). It used their 251 prime mover. The locomotive rode on a pair of trucks of all-new design, known as the Hi-Ad, standing for 'high adhesion'. Visually, it is similar to the Century 630, but can be distinguished by the intercooler box. The C630 has two grilles here, one above the other. The C636 only has the upper grille.

Production 
Between 1967 and 1968, 34 C636 locomotives were built by Alco in Schenectady, New York.  Despite many new and innovative features, the C636 could not hold its own in the marketplace. Three demonstrator locomotives were built costing Alco about $5.5 million. Problems with Alco demonstrator number 636-2, the only demonstrator locomotive operating, were a factor in dissuading potential customers. During an evaluation on the Santa Fe Railway, the same traction motor blower on 636-2 failed and was replaced on three of four runs. Unit 636-2 also had unsatisfactory results while being tested on the Southern Pacific Railroad.

Montreal Locomotive Works produced the MLW M-636 variant of the C636 for Canadian Pacific Railway and Canadian National Railway.

In Australia, AE Goodwin built 29 C636s between May 1968 and September 1970 for Pilbara iron ore railroads. Hamersley Iron purchased 12 units in 5 separate orders. Bechtel purchased 5 C636s for use in the construction of the Mount Newman Mining facilities. The latter company ordered 12 C636s a year later and bought Bechtel's locomotives. Hamersley Iron had their fleet rebuilt in the 1980s by Comeng, Bassendean with the Australian designed Pilbara cab.

Original owners

Current usage 

As of March 2020, the only C636 in existence is in operation on the Delaware-Lackawanna Railroad of Scranton, PA. The two former Cartier, ex-Alco demonstrator units stored on the Bath and Hammondsport Railroad for many years have been scrapped by a local contractor. The NYS&W is currently an all-EMD powered railroad. The WNY&P still operates M630 and M636 MLW locomotives, but these units were scheduled be removed from service in Summer 2019 and replaced by GE AC6000CWs that formerly served with CSX Transportation. The WNYP M-630s and M-636s are reportedly going to the Delaware-Lackawanna in the future.

See also 
 List of ALCO diesel locomotives
 List of MLW diesel locomotives

References

External links

 Sarberenyi, Robert. Alco C636 Original Owners.

Century 636
BHP Billiton diesel locomotives
C-C locomotives
Diesel locomotives of Western Australia
Railway locomotives introduced in 1967
Standard gauge locomotives of Australia
Standard gauge locomotives of the United States
Standard gauge locomotives of Canada
Diesel-electric locomotives of Australia